Ambrosio Bibby Padilla (December 7, 1910 – August 11, 1996) was a Filipino basketball player and an elected member of the Senate of the Philippines. He was one of the most important figures in Asian basketball development.

Early life 
Padilla was born as the eighth of eleven children of Dr. Nicanor Padilla and Ysabel Bibby. He married Lourdes de las Alas on May 4, 1941, the eldest daughter of Taaleño senator Antonio de las Alas. Padilla fathered 10 children: 6 boys and 4 girls.

Athletic career 
Padilla was born in Lingayen, Pangasinan. He studied at the Ateneo de Manila for his high school and college education. In college, he was the team captain of the 1928 Ateneo de Manila Blue Eagles varsity basketball squad that won the 1928 NCAA (Philippines) basketball championship under coach James A. Martin, S.J. Later, he studied law at the University of the Philippines and became a varsity player of the university's baseball team in the early 1930s.

In 1930, Padilla played for the Philippines which won the gold medal of the 9th Far Eastern Games basketball tournament in Tokyo, Japan. He played alongside Jacinto Ciria Cruz and Mariano Filomeno. In 1934, he captained the national team that retained the basketball championship in the 10th Far Eastern Games held at home for the final time.

In 1936, Padilla as team captain of the national basketball team led the Philippines to a fifth-place finished in the 11th (1936) Summer Olympics held at Berlin, Germany. It remains the best finish by an Asian country in men's Olympic basketball history. The team was coached by Dionisio Calvo and, aside from Padilla, boasted of great players like Ciria Cruz and Charles Borck.

Padilla retired from basketball and became the chairman of the Philippine Amateur Athletic Federation (PAAF) Basketball Committee from 1938 to 1954.

The international governing body, FIBA, appointed Padilla as its Vice President for Asia from 1956 to 1964. He was one of the forefathers and later elected President of the Asian Basketball Confederation (ABC), now known as FIBA Asia, from 1960 to 1966 with his former coach Dionisio Calvo as the Secretary-General. When he finished his term, he served as the ABC president emeritus from 1967.

He became the sixth President of the Philippine Amateur Athletic Federation (PAAF), the forerunner of the Philippine Olympic Committee (POC), in 1970 and became the first president of the POC when PAAF was renamed POC in 1975.

Political career
President Ramon Magsaysay appointed Padilla as Solicitor General in 1954. He later resigned in 1957 to run for the Senate and won. He served in the Senate until 1972 when President Ferdinand Marcos declared Martial Law. Notwithstanding his stature and brushing aside the dangers arising from his opposition to the martial law regime, he actively fought the Marcos regime with his legal skills and belief in freedom.

After Marcos was overthrown in the 1986 People Power Revolution, President Corazon Aquino appointed Padilla to the 1986 Constitutional Commission which was tasked to draft a new constitution for the country. Padilla was elected vice-chairman of the commission with former Supreme Court Associate Justice Cecilia Muñoz-Palma as its chairwoman. The new Constitution was officially ratified by the Filipino people in a plebiscite held on February 2, 1987.

Legacy
Padilla, who died on August 11, 1996, was inducted into the Philippine National Basketball Hall of Fame in January 1999 along with other Filipino basketball greats like Carlos Loyzaga, Lauro Mumar, Jacinto Ciria Cruz, Charles Borck, Edgardo Ocampo, Mariano Tolentino, and his own Olympic coach Chito Calvo. The Ateneo de Manila University's Ambrosio Padilla Award, which is given out annually to the university's best academically performing college varsity player from any sport, is named in his honor.

A classroom at Malcolm Hall of the University of the Philippines College of Law is named in his honor.

Prominent offspring 
Ambrosio Padilla is the father of Francisco "Frank" Padilla, Founder and Servant General of the Catholic renewal group Missionary Families of Christ and Alexander Padilla, CEO and President of PhilHealth from 2013 to 2016.

Awards and achievements
1928 NCAA Philippines champions
1930 Far Eastern Games champion
1934 Far Eastern Games champions
1936 Summer Olympics, fifth place
Philippine National Hall of Fame (1999)

See also
Philippine Constitutional Commission of 1986

References

External links
 

1910 births
1996 deaths
Solicitors General of the Philippines
Olympic basketball players of the Philippines
Basketball players at the 1936 Summer Olympics
Ateneo Blue Eagles men's basketball players
People from San Miguel, Manila
People from Pangasinan
Minority leaders of the Senate of the Philippines
Senators of the 7th Congress of the Philippines
Senators of the 6th Congress of the Philippines
Senators of the 5th Congress of the Philippines
Senators of the 4th Congress of the Philippines
Senators of the 3rd Congress of the Philippines
Filipino sportsperson-politicians
Philippines men's national basketball team players
Filipino men's basketball players
20th-century Filipino lawyers
Magsaysay administration personnel
Filipino sports executives and administrators
UP Fighting Maroons basketball players
Philippine Sports Hall of Fame inductees
Members of the Philippine Constitutional Commission of 1986
Philippine Collegian editors